The National Union of Public and General Employees (NUPGE) is a Canadian trade union. Taken in total it is the second largest union in Canada. Most of its 425,000 members work in the provincial public service sector. There is also a large and growing number of members who work for private businesses.

Its mission is to monitor provincial and federal labour laws and developments as well as analyse restructuring of social programs and public services. The National Union reports on and contributes to legislation affecting the Canadian workplace. It gives its members a national presence through participation in the Canadian Labour Congress (CLC) and internationally through Public Services International (PSI).

The 12 component unions are:
 British Columbia Government and Service Employees' Union (BCGEU)
 Health Sciences Association of British Columbia (HSA of BC)
 Health Sciences Association of Alberta (HSAA; joined 2003)
 Saskatchewan Government and General Employees' Union (SGEU)
 Manitoba Association of Health Care Professionals (MAHCP)
 Manitoba Government and General Employees' Union (MGEU)
 Ontario Public Service Employees Union (OPSEU)
 Canadian Union of Brewery and General Workers (CUBGW)
 New Brunswick Union of Public and Private Employees (NBUPPE)
 Nova Scotia Government and General Employees Union (NSGEU)
 Prince Edward Island Union of Public Sector Employees (PEIUPSE)
 Newfoundland and Labrador Association of Public and Private Employees (NAPE)

The National Union has a federated structure; its consists of the members of its component unions.

The Alberta Union of Provincial Employees was a member of NUPGE until 2001 when it was suspended for trying to take members from another union. Then in 2006 the AUPE decided to disaffiate from the NUPGE and by extension the Canadian Labour Congress and Alberta Federation of Labour.

Its current officers are Larry Brown, National President, and Bert Blundon, National Secretary-Treasurer.

References
 Membership info from web site.

External links

www.nupge.ca
National Union of Public and General Employees – Canadian Labour Unions – Web Archive created by the University of Toronto Libraries

Canadian Labour Congress
Public Services International